Bille may refer to:

Bille (given name)
Bille (surname)
Bille (Elbe), a river in Germany
Billé, a French commune
Bille (noble family), a Danish noble family
Bille tribe, Ijaw tribe in Nigeria

See also
Billa (disambiguation)